is a Japanese windsurfer. He competed in the Windglider event at the 1984 Summer Olympics.

References

1960 births
Living people
Japanese male sailors (sport)
Japanese windsurfers
Olympic sailors of Japan
Sailors at the 1984 Summer Olympics – Windglider
Place of birth missing (living people)